The Europeans is a weekly independent podcast focusing on the "often overlooked news items affecting Europe". It is produced and presented by Katy Lee, a journalist based in Paris, and Dominic Kraemer, an opera singer based in Amsterdam.  

In May 2018 the podcast was the Dutch national nominee for the European Charlemagne Youth Prize, and in 2019 was a winner of the European Commission's Altiero Spinelli Prize for Outreach, for "works that aimed to enhance young peoples' understanding of the European Union, with a focus on participation in EU democratic processes." Also in 2019, and in the context of that year's European Parliament elections, the podcast received a grant from the European Cultural Foundation to produce the three-part series Bursting the bubble to "explain how the E.U. actually works without boring you to death."

Lee and Kraemer, both originally from England, intended for the show "to make Europe cool again" and consequently it "proudly announces itself [as a] Brexit free zone". Alongside other regular segments, each episode features an interview. Past guests include: Igor Levit, Christoph Niemann, Rokhaya Diallo, Emma Holten, Akbar Ahmed, Patrick Gathara, Jacek Dehnel, Darach Ó Séaghdha, Actress, and Joris Luyendijk.

Episodes
Each regular episode features the segments "good week; bad week", "happy ending" and at least one interview. The list of episodes, publication date, interviewee(s) and description of the interview topic are as follows:

2017

2018

2019

2020

2021

2022

References

External links
 

2017 podcast debuts
Audio podcasts
Interview podcasts
French podcasts